Jenny and the Soldier is a 1947 Danish dramatic film written and directed by Johan Jacobsen. The black-and-white film is based on the 1940 stage play Brudstykker af et mønster written by Danish playwright Carl Erik Soya. The gritty romantic drama received critical praise for its authentic portrayal of everyday life. Jacobsen received the first Bodil Award for Best Danish Film, while both Poul Reichhardt and Bodil Kjer were awarded Bodils for their leading roles. Jenny and the Soldier is one of the twelve films listed in Denmark's cultural canon by the Danish Ministry of Culture.

Synopsis 
Two common working-class people, Robert and Jenny, meet one day in a bar. After Robert defends Jenny against her date, a district attorney's chauffeur, who is trying to get her drunk, they begin a relationship. She soon discovers that she will be tried in court for an abortion she needed a few years previously. Her parents disown her and she loses her job as a saleswoman. Robert stays with her, admitting his own responsibility for killing someone when he was 17 years old. Distraught at the thought of going to prison, Jenny convinces Robert to commit suicide with her. Just as she is planning the suicide, her lawyer comes and announces that the case has been dropped—the case had been delayed too long while the district attorney was in the hospital after his chauffeur has caused an automobile accident. The film ends with the couple declaring that in spite of their ancient unfortunate circumstances, they have at least one another, after which they embrace each other.

Cast 
 Poul Reichhardt as Robert Olsen, soldier
 Bodil Kjer as Jenny Christensen
 Elith Pio as district attorney
 Karin Nellemose as district attorney's wife
 Johannes Meyer as Jenny's father
 Maria Garland as Jenny's mother
 Sigfred Johansen as prosecutor
 Gunnar Lauring as Gustav, district attorney's chauffeur
 Svend Methling as Sveistrup, "The Crazy Lawyer"
 Jessie Rindom as a gardener (credited as Jessie Lauring)
 Per Buckhøj as bartender
 Kirsten Borch as district attorney's maid
 Birgitte Reimer as prosecutor's secretary

References

External links 
 
 
 

1947 films
1947 romantic drama films
Best Danish Film Bodil Award winners
Danish black-and-white films
Danish Culture Canon
Danish romantic drama films
1940s Danish-language films
Films based on Danish novels
Films directed by Johan Jacobsen
Films set in Denmark
Films shot in Denmark